Kholat Syakhl, a transliteration of Mansi Holatchahl meaning "dead mountain" or "silent peak", is a mountain in the northern Ural region of Russia, on the border between the Komi Republic and Sverdlovsk Oblast.

On February 2, 1959, a group of ski hikers led by Igor Dyatlov mysteriously perished on the east shoulder of Kyolat Syakhl (not Otorten, as is sometimes erroneously reported). This Dyatlov Pass incident is the main reason that people outside the immediate area in Russia have heard of this remote peak.

Nomenclature
The name of this mountain simply meant a "lack of game" for native Mansi hunters. The word kholat (meaning "silent" or "meager") is a relatively common placename element within Mansi territory, and it is a part of at least 3 other local geographic names. 

In Russian, the Mansi name can be translated as myórtvaya vershína (мёртвая вершина), literally "dead peak".

Note that this article's Russian-language version (especially the Этимология/Etymology section) has much more detail about the origin of, and disputes about, the mountain's name.

Historic References
In documents related to the investigation into the Dyatlov Pass ski-hikers, Kholat Syakhl is often referred to as "height 1079"  — its height on topographic maps issued before 1963.

References

Mountains of the Komi Republic
Ural Mountains
Ural Federal District
Mountains of Sverdlovsk Oblast